The Starwood was a popular nightclub and music venue in West Hollywood, California from early 1973 to 1981. Many punk bands and heavy metal bands started their careers playing at the club. The Starwood was located on the northwest corner of Santa Monica Blvd. and Crescent Heights Blvd.

History

P.J.'s (1961-1973)
The Starwood was preceded by P.J.'s, a fashionable jazz and pop music nightclub during the 1960s, which attracted a large number of film and TV personalities, and some old school jazz musicians. Established in February 1961 by Paul Raffles, Chuck Murano, Bill Daugherty, and Elmer Valentine, it hosted such acts as the Bobby Fuller Four, the Standells, Rufus Thomas, Trini Lopez, and Kool & the Gang, all of whom recorded live albums there. Other notable performers at the venue were the Flying Burrito Brothers, and Tim Buckley. The club was managed by Valentine until he left to cofound the Whisky a Go Go in January 1964.

In late 1971, P.J.'s was bought by alleged organized crime figures Eddie Nash and Dominic Lucci, together with Hal Glickman. After receiving a light renovation, the club was reopened to the public in January, 1972.

Starwood (1973-1981)
In 1973, after Nash bought out Lucci's and Glickman's ownership interests in the P.J.'s club, it became the Starwood, which was managed by Gary Fontenot until the club closed permanently on June 13, 1981, by order of the Los Angeles County authorities due to too many citations for underage drinking and noise abatement issues, among others. In May 1982, before its scheduled demolition, it caught fire, though not burning totally. The blaze occurred while unexplained fires befell other Nash-owned properties at the time. Subsequently, the structure was torn down, and a mini-mall replaced the nightclub.

The Starwood was highly instrumental in the careers of many regional bands and artists including Van Halen, X, the Germs (who played their legendary last show at the venue), the Go-Go's, Fear, Circle Jerks, the Knack, W.A.S.P. (known as Circus Circus at the time), the Motels, Quiet Riot, Dokken and the Runaways.

Ray Manzarek's short lived band, Nite City, appeared at the club and recorded their set for their live album, Starwood Club, Los Angeles. 02/23/1977.

Mötley Crüe, one of the most successful bands to emerge from the Sunset Strip music scene, played their first concert together as a band at the Starwood on April 24, 1981 with help from the band's bass guitarist, Nikki Sixx, who was employed by the Starwood as a janitor and convinced his boss to let them play there, opening for the already established California-based band Y&T. Sixx had performed at the Starwood prior to forming Mötley Crüe with his former band, London.

Some of the acts from outside of California who played at the Starwood include Blue Öyster Cult (under the name Soft White Underbelly), Aerosmith (under the name Dr. J. Jones & the Interns), The Damned, Devo, the Jam, Cheap Trick, the Ramones, the Dead Boys, the Stranglers, AC/DC, Slade, Vince Vance & the Valiants, Rush, Rory Gallagher, UFO, the Fleshtones, and Judas Priest, who did three nights at the Starwood in 1978.

The Starwood had two rooms with a hallway between; one room was a small dance floor and the other was the concert venue. Paid admission allowed access to both rooms, although the concert side was always crowded. The venue was small, what is commonly known today as 'shoebox' size, and configured with a long stage.

In popular culture
 The Starwood was mentioned in the Red Hot Chili Peppers' song "Deep Kick (Had to sneak into the Starwood)".
 The club is also mentioned (along with Madame Wong's and the Whisky a Go Go)in the title track from Frank Zappa's 1981 album, Tinsel Town Rebellion.

See also
P.J.'s (in French)

References

External links
 TLC (November 20, 2008). "Starwood 1973- 1982". The Go-Go's Notebook.
 John (March 20, 2014). "Gary Fontenot, Manager of the Starwood" (obituary and interview). Wonderland1981.

Defunct nightclubs in California
Sunset Boulevard (Los Angeles)
West Hollywood, California
Landmarks in Los Angeles
Nightclubs in Los Angeles County, California
Music venues in Los Angeles
Former music venues in California
Buildings and structures in West Hollywood, California
Punk rock venues
Demolished music venues in the United States
1973 establishments in California
1981 disestablishments in California